Prima J is an American  musical duo, composed of cousins Jessica and Janelle Martinez. Jessica (born on May 25, 1988) and Janelle (born on August 26, 1988) came up with their stage name by combining the letter "J" in each of their given names with the Spanish word "prima" (meaning female cousin).

Career
Their self-titled debut album was released on June 27, 2008. They made their debut in 2007 with the single "Rock Star" for the Bratz Motion Picture Soundtrack. They were discovered by former talent manager Bruce Johnson, who, along with his business partner Jorge Hernandez, introduced the cousins to songwriter Stefanie Ridel.

Prima J made a brief appearance in Bratz, auditioning for the school talent show. Three of Bratz’s stars, Logan Browning, Janel Parrish, and Nathalia Ramos, appear in the "Rock Star" music video.

Prior to "Rock Star,” they performed the song "Gotta Lotta" for the Disney Channel original movie Jump In!, which was released on the film's soundtrack. They also starred in Baby Bash's music video "What Is It.” They made a cameo in the direct-to-DVD film Bring It On: Fight to the Finish, the fifth installment of the Bring It On series.

In 2016, Janelle and Jessica reunited after a nearly eight-year hiatus. They host a radio broadcast with Dash Radio and released a single entitled "Ladies" on March 10, 2017.

Discography
Studio albums
 Prima J (2008)

References

External links
 

Female musical duos
American pop music groups
American women rappers
Geffen Records artists
American pop girl groups
Musical groups from Los Angeles
Family musical groups
Spanish-language singers of the United States
American musical duos
Hispanic and Latino American musicians
American musicians of Mexican descent
People from Rosemead, California